Malijai is a commune in the Alpes-de-Haute-Provence department in southeastern France.

Geography
The village lies on the right bank of the Bléone, which forms part of the commune's western border, then flows west through the northern part of the commune.

Population

See also
Communes of the Alpes-de-Haute-Provence department

References

Communes of Alpes-de-Haute-Provence
Alpes-de-Haute-Provence communes articles needing translation from French Wikipedia